Micromosaicism may refer to:
Micromosaic, a piece of art
Low-level genetic mosaicism